José Enrique is a Spanish given name. It may refer to:

José Enrique (footballer) (born 1986), Spanish footballer
José Enrique Angulo (born 1995), Ecuadorian footballer
José Enrique Arrarás (born 1937), Puerto Rican politician
José Enrique Caraballo (born 1996), Venezuelan footballer
José Enrique Cima (born 1952), Spanish cyclist
José Enrique García (born 1967), Uruguayan footballer
José Enrique Gutiérrez (born 1974), Spanish cyclist
José Enrique Manica (born 1993), Mexican footballer
José Enrique Moyal (1910–1998), mathematical physicist and engineer
José Enrique Pedreira (1904–1959), Puerto Rican composer
José Enrique Peña (born 1963), Uruguayan footballer
José Enrique Porto (born 1977), Spanish Paralympic cyclist
José Enrique Ramírez (born 1992), Dominican Republic baseball player
José Enrique Rodó (1872–1917), Uruguayan essayist
José Enrique Sarabia (born 1940), Venezuelan poet, musician
José Enrique Serrano (born 1943), American politician
José Enrique Varela (1891–1951), Spanish military officer

See also

Spanish masculine given names